Juan González Meneses (also Don Juan González de Meneses y de la Parra)(died 28 Jun 1521) was a Roman Catholic prelate who served as the Bishop of Almería (1520–1521).

Biography
On 17 September 1520, Juan González Meneses was selected by the King of Spain and confirmed by Pope Leo X as Bishop of Almería. He served as Bishop of Almería until his death on 28 June 1521.

References 

1521 deaths
16th-century Roman Catholic bishops in Spain
Bishops appointed by Pope Leo X